Macedonian numerals are words that are used in Macedonian for expressing quantity. The Macedonian numerals have three grammatical genders (masculine, feminine and neutral) and they can have articles. There are several types of numerals: cardinal numerals, ordinal numerals, collective numerals and multiplicative numerals.

Cardinal numerals
The cardinal numerals in Macedonian are:

The numerals from 10 - 20 are formed by adding the suffix -наесет (-naeset) to the basic numeral. The suffix -naeset comes from the Old Macedonian suffix -на десет (-na deset).

The numerals 20, 30, 40 and 60 are formed by adding the suffix -есет (-eset, from the Old Macedonian -десет/ -deset). The numerals 50, 70, 80 and 90 are formed by adding the old suffix -десет (-deset). Notice that when we form the number 60, we do not pronounce or write the last two letters of the basic number, шест (šest) > шеесет (šeeset). The same rule goes for the number 50, in other words, we do not pronounce or write the last letter of the basic number. These two rules are used for better and easier pronunciation.

The numbers between the decimal numbers are formed on the following way: decimal number + и (and) + the basic number.

On the same way are formed the rest of the numbers.

The numbers 100, 200 and 300 are formed by adding the word -сто (-sto) to the basic number.  The numbers over 300 are formed by adding the suffix -стотини (-стотини) to the basic number.

The rest of the numbers are formed same as the numerals between the decimal numerals.

The decagonal numerals are formed by adding the word -илјада (-iljada) to the basic numeral. The numbers between the decagonal numbers are formed on the same way as the numbers between the decimal numbers.

The millions and the numbers between the millions are formed on the same way as the decagonal numerals.

The further numerals are милијарда / milijarda (billion), трилион / trilion (trillion) etc. and they are formed as the other Macedonian numerals.

Example
 12 332 789 : дванаесет милиони триста триесет и две илјади седумстотини осумдесет и девет. (dvanaeset milioni trista trieset i dve iljadi sedumstotini osumdeset i devet)

Ordinal numerals
The forming of the ordinal numerals depends on the gender of the numeral. To form the ordinal numerals we add -ti (m.), -ta (f.), -to (n.) to the basic numeral. Exception to this rule are the ordinal numerals first, second and third. If the basic word ends on the letter t and we add the suffixes for ordinal numerals, then a double t is generally produced. For the ordinal numerals seventh and eighth, we reduce some of the letters of the basic number, for example: osum > osmi (eighth), sedum > sedmi (seventh).

Macedonian language
Macedonian grammar
Numerals